The 2015 Yau Tsim Mong District Council election was held on 22 November 2015 to elect all 19 members to the Yau Tsim Mong District Council.

Overall election results
Before election:

Change in composition:

References

2015 Hong Kong local elections